Geekom (stylized in all caps as GEEKOM) is a Taiwan-based multinational consumer electronics company specializing in mini PCs. It is one of the largest manufacturers of mini PCs in the world.

History 
Kom de Olde founded Geekom in 2003 with the expressed goal of dedicating the company to the "research and development of computer products." In late 2021, Geekom switched its focus to the mini PC market and has since become one of the world's leading manufacturers of mini PCs.

Products 
Geekom specializes in the production and sale of mini PCs. It launched its first flagship mini PC, the Mini IT8, on 20 November 2021. The Mini IT8 has been praised as an "affordable and compact" alternative to NUCs, a similar line of barebone computers produced by Intel. , Geekom has released the following three mini PCs in addition to the Mini IT8: the Mini IT8 SE, MiniAir 11, and Mini IT11.

In January 2022, GEEKOM partnered with Intel to launch its first gaming laptop, the GEEKOM BookFun 11, marking Geekom's first venture into the smart laptop market.

References

External links 
 Geekom official website
 Jiteng Company website

Computer companies established in 2003
Consumer electronics brands
Multinational companies headquartered in Taiwan
Nettop
Taiwanese brands